The Olive Tree is a 2016 Spanish drama film directed by Icíar Bollaín. It was also shortlisted as one of three films as the Spanish submission for the Best Foreign Language Film at the 89th Academy Awards, but was not selected.

Plot
Alma is a 20-year-old girl and adores her grandfather, a man who has not spoken for years. When the elderly man also refuses to eat, the girl decides to recover the millenary tree that the family sold against his will. In order to succeed, she needs to count on her uncle, a victim of the crisis, her friend Rafa, and her whole town to help her. The problem is to find out where in Europe the olive tree is.

Cast
 Anna Castillo as Alma
 Javier Gutiérrez as Alcachofa
 Pep Ambròs as Rafa
 Manuel Cucala as Ramón
 Miguel Angel Aladren as Luis
 Ana Isabel Mena as Sole
 Carme Pla as Vanessa

Awards and nominations

References

External links
 

2016 films
2016 drama films
2010s drama road movies
Spanish drama road movies
2010s Spanish-language films
Films about trees
Films set in Düsseldorf
Films directed by Icíar Bollaín
2010s Spanish films